Francesca Sanvitale (17 May 1928 – 9 February 2011) was an Italian novelist and journalist, "one of Italy's most renowned contemporary authors".

Life
Born in Milan, Francesca Sanvitale lived in Florence for two decades, gaining a degree there in Italian literature before moving to Rome in 1961. She wrote television plays and contributed to cultural programmes for RAI.

Her first novel was Il cuore borghese (1972). Madre e figlia (1980), a semi-autobiographical novel about an intense relationship between a mother and her illegitimate child, won both the Fregene Prize and the Pozzale Luigi Russo Prize. The protagonist in Sanvitale's third novel, L'uomo del parco (1984), attempted to find the truth about herself through psychoanalysis.  As well as other novels, Sanvitale collected short stories in La realtà è un dono (1987) and Separazioni (1997). L'inizio è in autunno won the Viareggio Prize in 2008.

She died in Rome.

Works
 Il cuore borghese [The bourgeois heart], 1972
 Madre e figlia, 1980
 L'uomo del parco: romanzo [The man in the heart], 1984
 La realtà è un dono: racconti [Reality is a gift: stories], 1987
 Mettendo a fuoco : pagine di letteratura e realtà, 1988
 (tr.) Il diavolo in corpo by Raymond Radiguet, 1989. Translated from the French Le Diable au corps (1923)
 Verso Paola, 1991
 Il figlio dell'Impero, 1993
 Tre favole dell'ansia e dell'ombra, 1994
 Separazioni [Separations], 1997
 Camera ottica: pagine di letteratura e realtà, 1999
 L'ultima casa prima del bosco, 2003
 L'inizio è in autunno, 2008

References

External links

1928 births
2011 deaths
Journalists from Milan
Writers from Milan
20th-century Italian novelists
21st-century Italian novelists